84th Anniversary Bang Bon Stadium or Chalerm Phrakiat Bang Bon Stadium is a multi-purpose stadium in Bang Bon District, Bangkok, Thailand.  The stadium was built to celebrate the 84th birthday of King Bhumibol Adulyadej, hence the name of the venue. It is currently used mostly for football matches. The stadium holds 5,000 people.

References

Football venues in Thailand
Multi-purpose stadiums in Thailand